Skathi may refer to:

 An anglicized form of the Old Norse goddess name Skaði
 Skadi Mons on Venus
 Skathi (moon) is a tiny moon of Saturn discovered in 2000, named after the above goddess

See also

 Skadi (disambiguation)